Selwyn Fernandes (born 20 March 1980) is a retired Indian professional footballer who played as a defender and last played for I-League club Dempo.

Fernandes has also played at Fransa-Pax, Vasco, East Bengal, Salgaocar, Raia, Churchill Brothers, Mumbai, and Pune in the league and he has also played internationally with India.

Honours

India
SAFF Championship third place: 2003

References

Footballers from Goa
1980 births
Living people
Pune FC players
I-League players
Vasco SC players
East Bengal Club players
Salgaocar FC players
Churchill Brothers FC Goa players
Mumbai FC players
Dempo SC players
Indian footballers
India international footballers
Association football defenders